Griddharaj Parvat, which means "the hill of vultures" (also called Griddhakut Parvat, known locally as Giddhaila Pahar and known in English as Vulture Peak), is a hill of religious, archeological and ecological importance.

It is situated near Devrajnagar village in the tehsil of Ramnagar, in the district of Satna and the state of Madhya Pradesh, in India. It is located 65 km south of Satna and 8 km from Ramnagar town. Its latitude and longitude are 24°18' North and 81°15' East. The hill is situated between the Kaimur Range to the north and the Maikal Hills to the south.

References

 Jitan Singh Diwan, Kothi State, 1907: Rewa Rajya Darpan
 Kalidasa : Griddharaja Mahatmya (Narada Uvacha)
 Shiva Samhita (Chapter 19-Bhoogol varnan)
 James Legge: A Record of Buddhist Kingdoms (Being an Account by the Chinese Monk Fa-Hien of his Travels in India and Ceylon (A.D. 399-414) in Search of the Buddhist Books of Discipline.)

External links
 A Record of Buddhist Kingdoms by Fa-Hien, translated by James Legge

Hills of Madhya Pradesh
Locations in Hindu mythology
Buddhist pilgrimage sites in India
Culture of Madhya Pradesh
Satna